Christakis Omirou Mavris (born 5 June 1956), sometimes referred to as Christos Omirou, Christos Mavris or simply Takis Mavris, is a Cypriot former footballer who played as a midfielder and made 17 appearances for the Cyprus national team.

Career
Mavris made his debut for Cyprus on 27 October 1976 in a 1978 FIFA World Cup qualification match against Denmark, which finished as a 0–5 loss. He went on to make 17 appearances, scoring 1 goal, before making his last appearance on 23 December 1984 in a 1986 FIFA World Cup qualification match against the Netherlands, which finished as a 0–1 loss.

Career statistics

International

International goals

Honours
Omonia
 Cypriot First Division: 1974–75, 1975–76, 1976–77, 1977–78, 1978–79, 1980–81, 1981–82, 1982–83, 1983–84, 1984–85, 1986–87,
 Cypriot Cup: 1979–80, 1980–81, 1981–82, 1982–83
 Cypriot Super Cup: 1979, 1980, 1981, 1982, 1983, 1987

References

External links
 
 
 
 Takis Mavris at 11v11.com

1956 births
Living people
Cypriot footballers
Cyprus international footballers
Association football midfielders
AC Omonia players
Cypriot First Division players
Sportspeople from Nicosia